Johnnie Otis Jackson (born January 30, 1971 in Hammonton, New Jersey) is an American IFBB professional bodybuilder and powerlifter. Jackson has been said to have one of the best developed upper bodies in professional bodybuilding in the world. He is known for training in Arlington, Texas, with fellow American IFBB pro competitor Branch Warren. Due to his strength, he has sometimes been referred to (especially in 2009) as the world's strongest bodybuilder.

Biography
Jackson first competed in an NPC (National Physique Committee) in 2001, where he won the NPC USA. His first IFBB competition was the GNC Show of Strength (now defunct) of 2002, where he placed 10th. His first IFBB Night of Champions was in 2003, where he placed 5th. Later that same year he competed in the Ironman Pro Invitational, where he placed 9th.

In 2003, he competed in his first Mr. Olympia, where he placed 11th. His first Arnold Classic was in 2006, where he placed 13th. Jackson regularly competes in powerlifting events and often incorporates this type of training into his workouts. Jackson lives in Fort Worth, Texas, and trains at Metroflex Gym in Arlington, Texas, with training partner Branch Warren. Both have trained with Janae Kroc. Jackson is one of the few professional bodybuilders who has consistently competed in the "Mr. Olympia" competition for over 13 years, only sitting out in 2009 when he competed in the "Mr. Olympia 2009 World's Strongest Professional Bodybuilder".

Johnnie Jackson competed in the 2008 United States Powerlifting Federation (USPF) National Powerlifting Championships in Warwick, Rhode Island on June 29, 2009. He opened the bench press competition with an easy first attempt of 465 lbs (232 kg) unaided by a bench shirt. His next two lifts were disqualified although he was able to handle the heavy weight, including a close miss at 600 lb with bench press shirt. Jackson set a USPF World Record on his first attempt at deadlift with a pull of 345 kg (760 lbs) in a deadlift suit, which was followed by two close misses of 372.5 kg (821 lbs), whereby he pulled his left hamstring during the third and last attempt.

In 2009, Jackson earned the title "Mr. Olympia 2009 World's Strongest Professional Bodybuilder" by benching 523 lbs (237 kg) in an old polyester blast bench shirt and deadlifting 815 lbs (370 kg) in a champions deadlift suit for a 1,338 lb push/pull total defeating Ben White, who bench pressed 573 lbs and deadlifted 633 lbs for a 1,206 lb total in the same equipment. This record was surpassed a year later by Stan Efferding in the Mr. Olympia 2010 World's Strongest Professional Bodybuilder contest with a 1,428 lb total (628 lb + 800 lb).

Jackson competed in the Raw Unity Deadlift Competition on January 22, 2012. He deadlifted 771 lbs raw on his first attempt, missed his second at 832 lbs, but easily pulled the 832 lbs raw on the third attempt for his all-time personal best at age 40 as a master class lifter.

Stats
Full Name: Johnnie Otis Jackson
Place of Birth: Hammonton, New Jersey
Date of Birth: January 30, 1971
Current Residence: Hurst, Texas
Occupation: IFBB professional bodybuilder, personal trainer
Physique stats
Height: 5'8"
Contest Weight: 255 lb
Off-Season Weight: 275 lb
Eye Color: Brown
Hair Color: Black
Chest 57"
Arms: 23"
Waist: 32"
Gym stat
Squat (1 rep max.): 825 lb with squat suit, unofficial gym max
Bench Press (1 rep max.): 600 lb with bench shirt, unofficial gym max
Deadlift  (1 rep max.): 832 lb raw, official deadlift-only meet result
Barbell Curl (8 rep max.): 225 lb

Contest history

1998 NPC Texas State Championships, Middleweight, 2nd
1999 NPC Junior Nationals, Light-Heavyweight, 1st
1999 NPC Nationals, Light-Heavyweight, 11th
2000 NPC USA Championships, Light-Heavyweight, 2nd
2001 NPC Nationals, Light-Heavyweight, 1st and Overall
2001 NPC USA Championships, Light-Heavyweight, 1st
2002 Show of Strength Pro Championship, 10th
2003 Grand Prix England, 5th
2003 Grand Prix Holland, 5th
2003 Ironman Pro Invitational, 9th
2003 Night of Champions, 5th
2003 Mr. Olympia, 11th
2003 San Francisco Pro Invitational, 9th
2003 Show of Strength Pro Championship, 10th
2004 Grand Prix Australia, 8th
2004 Hungarian Pro Invitational, 5th
2004 Ironman Pro Invitational, 7th
2004 Mr. Olympia, 14th
2004 San Francisco Pro Invitational, 9th
2004 Show of Strength Pro Championship, 7th
2004 Toronto Pro Invitational, 2nd
2005 Europa Supershow, 2nd
2005 Mr. Olympia, 11th
2005 Toronto Pro Invitational, 2nd
2006 Arnold Classic, 13th
2006 San Francisco Pro Invitational, 7th
2006 Europa Super Show, 3rd
2006 Montreal Pro, 1st
2006 Atlantic City Pro, 2nd
2006 Mr. Olympia, 13th
2007 Atlantic City Pro, 1st
2007 Mr. Olympia, 9th
2008 Ironman Pro Invitational, 5th
2008 Arnold Classic, 9th
2008 Mr. Olympia, 12th
2009 Ironman Pro, 10th
2009 Tampa Pro, 8th
2009 Europa Pro, 12th
2010 Phoenix Pro, 12th
2010 Arnold Classic, 12th
2010 New York Pro, 8th
2010 Tampa Pro, 3rd
2010 Europa Pro, 6th
2010 Mr. Olympia, 11th
2011 Arnold Classic, 7th
2011 Mr. Olympia, 13th
2012 FIBO Power Pro Germany, 1st
2012 Mr. Olympia, 9th
2012 EVLS Prague Pro 1, 3rd
2013 Arnold Classic, 4th
2013 Mr. Olympia, 16th
2014 Mr. Olympia, 11th
2015 Mr. Olympia, 15th
2017 Arnold Classic South Africa, 1st
2017 Toronto Pro, 1st

See also
List of male professional bodybuilders

References

External links
Official website

1971 births
Professional bodybuilders
African-American bodybuilders
American bodybuilders
Living people
People from Hammonton, New Jersey
21st-century African-American sportspeople
20th-century African-American sportspeople